Brian James Strait (born January 4, 1988) is an American professional ice hockey defenseman who is an unrestricted free agent. He last played for the Binghamton Devils of the American Hockey League (AHL) while under contract to the New Jersey Devils of the National Hockey League (NHL). He has previously played with the Pittsburgh Penguins, New York Islanders and the Winnipeg Jets in the NHL.

Playing career

Amateur
As a youth, Strait played in the 2002 Quebec International Pee-Wee Hockey Tournament with the Middlesex Islanders minor ice hockey team.

Strait played two seasons at the Northfield Mount Hermon School, recording 12 points during his freshman season, and 20 the next year. Beginning in 2004 he joined the U.S. National Development Team in the North American Hockey League. He was the captain of the gold-medal U.S. team at the 2006 IIHF World U18 Championships.

After graduating from Ann Arbor Pioneer High School in 2006, Strait attended Boston University, where he began playing for the Boston Terriers men's ice hockey team. In his freshman season, Strait was twice selected as Hockey East rookie of the week. He served as captain of the U.S. team at the 2008 World Junior Ice Hockey Championships, where the team finished fourth. That season he also was selected runner-up for the Hockey East Best Defensive Defenseman award. During his junior season at Boston, Strait served as an alternate captain. That season, the Terriers won the Beanpot, Hockey East and the NCAA Division I national championship.

Professional
After his junior season at Boston University, Strait signed a three-year entry-level contract with the Pittsburgh Penguins, who selected Strait in 2006. He began his professional career a few months later with the Penguins' American Hockey League affiliate, the Wilkes-Barre/Scranton Penguins.

Strait made his NHL debut with Pittsburgh on February 21, 2011 against the Washington Capitals. On the eve of the lockout shortened 2012–13 season, he was picked off of waivers from the Penguins by the New York Islanders January 18, 2013. After establishing his role within the Islanders defense after 6 games he signed a three-year one-way extension deal worth $775,000 per year on January 31, 2013. He scored his first NHL goal on December 20, 2013 against Henrik Lundqvist of the New York Rangers.

On July 1, 2016, Strait signed a one-year contract as a free agent with the Winnipeg Jets. Strait appeared in 5 games for 2 assists, over the course of the 2016–17 season, in his lone year with the Jets.

Having left the Jets at the conclusion of his contract, Strait returned to the Metropolitan division, in signing a one-year, two-way contract with the New Jersey Devils on July 1, 2017. In the 2017–18 season, he was reassigned to serve as an Alternate captain with the Devils AHL affiliate, the Binghamton Devils. Adding a veteran presence for the B-Devils inaugural campaign, Strait appeared in 61 games for 8 points. On May 8, 2018, Strait opted to forgo free agency agreeing to a two-year, two-way extension to remain with the New Jersey Devils.

Career statistics

Regular Season and Playoffs

International

References

External links

1988 births
American men's ice hockey defensemen
Binghamton Devils players
Boston University Terriers men's ice hockey players
Ice hockey players from Massachusetts
Living people
Manitoba Moose players
New York Islanders players
Northfield Mount Hermon School alumni
Sportspeople from Waltham, Massachusetts
Pittsburgh Penguins draft picks
Pittsburgh Penguins players
Wilkes-Barre/Scranton Penguins players
Winnipeg Jets players
New Jersey Devils scouts